Bifrenaria charlesworthii is a species of orchid.

charlesworthii